This is a list of Chinese football transfers for the 2013 season summer transfer window. Only moves from Super League and League One are listed. The transfer window will be opened from 1 July 2013 to 25 July 2013.

Super League

Beijing Guoan

In:

 
   
 
 

Out:

Changchun Yatai

In:

   

 

Out:

Dalian Aerbin

In:

Out:

Guangzhou Evergrande

In:

Out:

Guangzhou R&F

In:

 
 
 
 
 
 

Out:

Guizhou Renhe

In:

 

Out:

Hangzhou Greentown

In:

Out:

Jiangsu Sainty

In:

Out:

Liaoning Whowin

In:

 

Out:

Qingdao Jonoon

In:

Out:

Shandong Luneng

In:

Out:

Shanghai Shenhua

In:

Out:

Shanghai Shenxin

In:

   
 
   

Out:

Shanghai SIPG

In:

Out:

Tianjin Teda

In:

 

Out:

Wuhan Zall

In:

Out:

League One

Beijing Baxy

In:

Out:

Beijing Technology

In:

Out:

Chengdu Blades

In:

 
 

Out:

Chongqing F.C.

In:

Out:

Chongqing Lifan

In:

 

Out:

Guangdong Sunray Cave

In:

Out:

Guizhou Zhicheng

In:

 
 

Out:

Harbin Yiteng

In:

 
 

Out:

Henan Jianye

In:

 

Out:

Hubei China-Kyle 

In:

 
 
 

Out:

Hunan Billows

In:

 
 

 

Out:

Shenyang Shenbei

In:

Out:

Shenzhen Ruby

In:

 

Out:

Shijiazhuang Yongchang

In:

 
  

Out:

Tianjin Songjiang

In:

Out:

Yanbian Changbai Tiger

In:

Out:

References

China
2013
2013 in Chinese football